Aquilegia  longissima, the long-spur columbine, is a rare perennial herb that is native to northern Mexico, Trans-Pecos Texas and southern Arizona.   In the original species description by Asa Gray in 1883, Aquilegia longissima is distinguished from the shorter-spurred golden columbine Aquilegia chrysantha based on the extremely long spur over 10 cm long, narrow spatulate petals and very slender spurs that usually hang straight down.  The petal spurs have been known to reach 16 cm in length,  the longest nectary spurs of any Eudicot. The plants typically flower in the fall after monsoon rains and are found in oak-pine-juniper woodlands in shaded canyons near intermittent streams or on talus slopes.  

William Trelease hypothesized in 1883  that the most likely pollinator of A. longissima would be the giant sphinx moth, Cocytius antaeus. The giant sphinx moth is a rare stray in west Texas and has been collected in Big Bend National Park near long-spur columbine populations;  however, the common pollinators are likely large hawkmoths in the genera Manduca and Agrius with tongue lengths from 9–14 cm long.

Hybridization is common in the genus Aquilegia and populations with intermediate spur lengths from 7–9 cm are found near some long-spur columbine populations.  In a multivariate analyses of floral characteristics, the intermediate plants with spurs 7–9 cm long cluster with the more common golden columbine.   One population with intermediate spur lengths is found at Cattail Falls in Big Bend National Park.  The plants at the base of the falls and along the stream flower in the spring, while much further up the canyons are small populations of long-spur columbine that flower after monsoon rains in the fall.

References

longissima
Flora of Mexico
Flora of Arizona
Flora of Texas